Senator Hager may refer to:

Alva L. Hager (1850–1923), Iowa State Senate
Henry G. Hager (born 1934), Pennsylvania State Senate
John S. Hager (1818–1890), U.S. Senator from California from 1873 to 1875
Peter Hager II (1784–1854), New York State Senate

See also
Glenn Hegar (born 1970), Texas State Senate